Charles Lemuel Young Jr. (born July 9, 1962) is an American politician. He is a member of the Mississippi House of Representatives from the 82nd District, being first elected in 2011. His district represents Lauderdale County including the city of Meridian. He is a member of the Democratic party.

Background
He is the son of Charles L. Young Sr., who served in the Mississippi House of Representatives from 1980 until his death in 2009. His paternal grandfather is E. F. Young Jr. who founded a cosmetics firm and a hotel based in Meridian, Mississippi.

His sister Veldore Young-Graham currently serves as the County Court Judge for Lauderdale County, Mississippi.

Electoral history

2011

2015

2019

Political positions

Religious Liberty Accommodations Act
Young is a vocal critic of Mississippi House Bill 1523 (H.B. 1523) which was passed by the legislature 69-44 in 2016.  The bill allows individuals to discriminate against same sex couples who have "deeply held religious beliefs or moral convictions" against such unions. Speaking to the Meridian Star after the passage of the bill, Young said:I, as an individual, might disagree from a personal standpoint with certain protections of human rights. I personally might not like gay rights, I personally might not like women's rights. But as a duly elected official, I have a sworn obligation to protect and to uphold every persons' rights. And as a publicly-elected official, I have to be able to separate my personal from my elected responsibilities in my capacity.

Mississippi State Flag Controversy
In 2020, Mississippi remains the only state in the United States that incorporates the Confederate battle flag. Contrary to many of his colleagues in the Lesgislature, Young believes that the fate of the flag should be decided by them, and not be left for the voters to decide:My preference would be that the Legislature not pass the buck and that the Legislature conduct the vote to determine the future of the current flag … We’re the only state in the nation that continues to bear the stars and bars and I think we need to change. My reason for that is financial. The state of Mississippi loses a ton of money each year.

References

1962 births
Living people
Cosmetics people
Democratic Party members of the Mississippi House of Representatives
People from Meridian, Mississippi
21st-century American politicians